Atul Rai is an Indian politician and a Member of Parliament from the Ghosi constituency in Uttar Pradesh. He defeated Bharatiya Janata Party's Hari narayan Rajbhar. He contested Lok Sabha Election with Bahujan Samaj Party's ticket and defeated his close rival with a margin of 122,568 votes.

Early life
Atul Rai was born on 20 February 1982 in Birpur village of Ghazipur district in Uttar Pradesh in a Bhumihar family. His father, Bharat Singh Rai, was an employee of Diesel Locomotive Works in Varanasi. Atul got his early education from Kendriya Vidyalaya, DLW, Varanasi. He graduated from Harish Chandra Postgraduate College, Varanasi. After graduation he started his own business.

His brother is Pawan Kumar Rai and his wife is Priyanka Singh.

Political career
Atul Rai joined Bahujan Samaj Party in 2015. He contested assembly election of Uttar Pradesh in 2017 from Zamania (Assembly constituency) and garnered 67,559 votes. In his first election he lost a close contest with 9,264 votes.

In 2019 General Lok sabha election Atul Rai Contested Parliament election from ghosi [Loksabha Constituency] and win election by margin of 122000+votes.

Rape allegations

In May 2019, a woman accused Atul Rai of rape at his home in Varanasi.  Mr. Rai, who denied the accusation, was arrested a month later and has been in jail since then.

In November 2020, Atul Rai's brother registered a police complaint accusing the victim of committing forgery.  The woman called the accusations as harassment and as an attempt to force her to withdraw the rape charge. However the court, in August 2021, issued a non-bailable arrest warrant against her.

In desperation, the woman and a male friend travelled from their state in Uttar Pradesh to the capital Delhi and on 16 August 2021, self-immolated themselves outside india's Supreme Court.  They were live on Facebook as they sprinkled petrol on themselves and lit the fire.  Before setting themselves alight the duo named several police officials, including then SSP Varanasi Amit Pathak and CO Bhelupur Amrendra Singh and a judge of MPMLA court Prayagraj, accusing them of colluding with Mr. Rai.

The man died at hospital on Saturday, 21 August 2021.  The woman succumbed to her death on the evening of Tuesday, 24 August 2021.

After this incident, the Yogi Adityanath government registered FIR against Rai and ex IPS Amitabh Thakur who had announced to contest election against Yogi Adityanath, while leaving everyone else. Thakur was arrested immediately after registration of FIR in a highly contentious manner. Thakur called this a targeted and selective political vendetta. The case is presently in Court.

References

Living people
Bahujan Samaj Party politicians
People from Mau
Lok Sabha members from Uttar Pradesh
1982 births
India MPs 2019–present
Bahujan Samaj Party politicians from Uttar Pradesh
People from Ghazipur